The 1904 Wyoming Cowboys football team represented the University of Wyoming as an independent during the 1904 college football season. In its fifth season under head coach William McMurray, the team compiled a 4–1–1 record and outscored opponents by a total of 97 to 35. J. Gillespie was the team captain.

Schedule

References

Wyoming
Wyoming Cowboys football seasons
Wyoming Cowboys football